Seven Trees is a Neighborhood of San Jose, California. It was formerly an unincorporated census-designated place surrounded completely by South San Jose and it was annexed into San Jose on November 23, 2009.

Geography
Seven Trees is located at  (37.287854, -121.837823).

Demographics
As of the census of 2000, there were 1,666 people, 403 households, and 307 families residing in the CDP. The racial makeup of the CDP was 43.64% White, 1.56% African American, 3.12% Native American, 7.62% Asian, 0.30% Pacific Islander, 36.73% from other races, and 7.02% from two or more races. Hispanic or Latino of any race were 68.01% of the population.

There were 403 households, out of which 39.0% had children under the age of 18 living with them, 51.1% were married couples living together, 16.9% had a female householder with no husband present, and 23.8% were non-families. 17.6% of all households were made up of individuals, and 7.4% had someone living alone who was 65 years of age or older.  The average household size was 4.13 and the average family size was 4.57.

In the CDP, the population was spread out, with 29.4% under the age of 18, 12.7% from 18 to 24, 30.4% from 25 to 44, 17.8% from 45 to 64, and 9.7% who were 65 years of age or older.  The median age was 30 years. For every 100 females, there were 105.7 males.  For every 100 females age 18 and over, there were 106.3 males.

The median income for a household in the CDP was $34,375, and the median income for a family was $43,313. Males had a median income of $33,625 versus $23,375 for females. The per capita income for the CDP was $17,012.  About 27.6% of families and 32.8% of the population were below the poverty line, including 53.8% of those under age 18 and 8.5% of those age 65 or over.

Government

References

Former census-designated places in California